Die Another Day is a 2002 film and the 20th Eon Productions James Bond film. 

Die Another Day may also refer to:

 Die Another Day (soundtrack), soundtrack of the film
 "Die Another Day" (song), the theme from the film interpreted by Madonna
 Die Another Day (Beatrice Eli album), 2014 album by Beatrice Eli
 "Die Another Day" (2013), a song by Korn on some editions of The Paradigm Shift
 "Die Another Day" (2022), a song by Dance Gavin Dance on Jackpot Juicer

See also 
 "Die Yet Another Night" (2016), another song by Korn from The Serenity of Suffering